Ursula Ulrike Holl (born 26 June 1982) is a retired German footballer. She currently works as the goalkeeping coach for Bundesliga side Bayer Leverkusen.

Career

Club
Holl started her career at TSV Uengershausen, before joining FSV Frankfurt, where she made her Bundesliga debut. She moved to local rivals 1. FFC Frankfurt in 2000, where she played for three seasons, but only appeared sporadically. However, she celebrated several major titles at the club, including the Treble in the 2002–03 season when Frankfurt won the Bundesliga, the German Cup and UEFA Women's Cup.

She returned to FSV Frankfurt in 2003 in order to play regular first team football. After two seasons, Holl transferred back to 1. FFC Frankfurt, now as the team's first choice goalkeeper. During her second stint at FFC Frankfurt, she won a second UEFA Women's Cup in the 2005–06 season, as well as another league title and the 2007 German Cup. From 2007 to 2009, Holl played for SC 07 Bad Neuenahr, before joining Bundesliga side FCR 2001 Duisburg. At Duisburg she was the Bundesliga runner-up in the 2009–10 season and won the 2010 German Cup, her fourth national cup title in total. After the 2010–11 season she left Duisburg and signed a one-year contract at Bundesliga side SG Essen-Schönebeck, after which she ended her active playing career.

International
At junior level, Holl won the UEFA Women's Under-19 Championship with the German team in 2000 and 2001. She was the first choice goalkeeper at both tournaments. Holl was Germany's third goalkeeper at the 2005 European Championship, winning her first international title without a single cap at senior level. She made her debut for the German national team almost two years later in March 2007 at the Algarve Cup against France. That year she also won the 2007 FIFA Women's World Cup with Germany, again as the team's third choice goalkeeper.

After the retirement of Silke Rottenberg, Holl has been Germany's first reserve goalkeeper to Nadine Angerer at the 2008 Summer Olympics, claiming bronze, and the 2009 European Championship, where Germany won its seventh title. Holl has been called up for the German 2011 FIFA Women's World Cup squad. She has not played in any match at these tournaments. Following the 2011 World Cup she retired from international play.

Coaching
On 2 December 2012 Holl signed on as Bayer 04 Leverkusen's goalkeeping coach.

Personal life
On 18 June 2010, Holl has married her partner Carina in Cologne, Germany. They live together in a same-sex union as recognised under German law.

Media career
As of the 2013–14 season Holl works as a pundit for Eurosport's coverage of the German Women's Bundesliga. She works in the same capacity for WDR on their coverage of the DFB-Pokal.

Honours

Club
1. FFC Frankfurt
UEFA Women's Cup: Winner (2) 2002–03, 2005–06
Bundesliga: Winner (4) 2000–01, 2001–02, 2002–03, 2006–07
German Cup: Winner (4) 2000–01, 2001–02, 2002–03, 2006–07, Runner-up (1) 2005–06

FCR 2001 Duisburg
Bundesliga: Runner-up (1) 2009–10
German Cup: Winner (1) 2009–10

International
FIFA World Cup: Winner (1) 2007
UEFA European Championship: Winner (2) 2005, 2009
Summer Olympic Games: Bronze medal (1) 2008
UEFA Women's Under-19 Championship: Winner (2) 2000, 2001

Individual
Silbernes Lorbeerblatt: 2007

References

External links

  
 Profile at the German Football Association 
 
 

1982 births
Living people
1. FFC Frankfurt players
2007 FIFA Women's World Cup players
2011 FIFA Women's World Cup players
FCR 2001 Duisburg players
Footballers at the 2008 Summer Olympics
FSV Frankfurt (women) players
German women's footballers
Germany women's international footballers
German LGBT sportspeople
Olympic bronze medalists for Germany
Olympic footballers of Germany
Olympic medalists in football
Sportspeople from Würzburg
SC 07 Bad Neuenahr players
Lesbian sportswomen
German LGBT footballers
Medalists at the 2008 Summer Olympics
FIFA Women's World Cup-winning players
Women's association football goalkeepers
UEFA Women's Championship-winning players
Footballers from Bavaria